The 9th Seiyu Awards ceremony was held on March 7, 2015 at the JOQR Media Plus Hall in Minato, Tokyo.

References

External links
 Winners of the 9th Seiyu Awards 

Seiyu Awards ceremonies
Seiyu
Seiyu
2015 in Japanese cinema
2015 in Japanese television